Óscar Fernández Monroy (born December 23, 1987) is a former Mexican footballer who last played as a striker for Sanarate FC.

Club career

Altamira
Fernández made his professional debut on 22 July 2012 against Toros Neza. Oscar Fernandez currently plays with Monarcas Morelia in La Liga MX.

References

External links

1987 births
Living people
Mexican footballers
Association football forwards
Altamira F.C. players
Bravos de Nuevo Laredo footballers
Tecamachalco F.C. footballers
Atlético Morelia players
Club Necaxa footballers
Alebrijes de Oaxaca players
Tampico Madero F.C. footballers
Liga MX players
Ascenso MX players
Liga Premier de México players
Mexican expatriate footballers
Expatriate footballers in Guatemala
Mexican expatriate sportspeople in Guatemala
Deportivo Sanarate F.C. players
Footballers from Mexico City